Cham Morad (also Romanized as Cham Morād) is a village in Hendijan-e Sharqi Rural District, in the Central District of Hendijan County, Khuzestan Province, Iran. At the 2006 census, its population was 338, in 65 families.

References 

Populated places in Hendijan County